Scrofiano is a village in Tuscany, central Italy, a frazione of the comune of Sinalunga in the province of Siena. It is located on  a hill in Val di Chiana, a few kilometers from Sinalunga proper.

Scrofiano was founded in around the 11th century. It is known however with certainty from the 12th century, when it was a fief of the Cacciaconti family, as part of the Republic of Siena. In the early 15th century it was the seat of a decisive battle between the Ghibelline Sienese and the Guelph Florentines.

In 1554 its castle was besieged by the Imperial-Florentine troops, which destroyed its walls.

Main sights
Torre del Cassero (12th century)
Palazzo Comunale (14th-15th centuries)
The Collegiata di San Biagio church (13th century), housing a canvas by Santi di Tito portraying the Pietà with St. Francis (c. 1580).
The church of the Company of San Salvatore is also home to a work by Santi di Tito.

Frazioni of Sinalunga
Hilltowns in Tuscany